Wang Bingbing (born December 31, 1969) is a Chinese ski mountaineer.

Wang was member of the national selection of the People's Republic of China at the 2007 Asian Championship of Ski Mountaineering, and finished third.

References

External links 
 Wang Bingbing at SkiMountaineering.org
 

1969 births
Living people
Chinese female ski mountaineers
21st-century Chinese women